The Wisconsin H-Alpha Mapper (WHAM) is a custom-built  telescope operated by the University of Wisconsin–Madison, used to study the Hydrogen-alpha ions of the warm ionized medium. It is a tenant telescope at the Cerro Tololo Inter-American Observatory (CTIO), in the Coquimbo Region of northern Chile.

History
First interest in the ionised hydrogen of the interstellar medium came when Ron Reynolds pointed a spectrometer through a makeshift observing portal in an office of the University of Wisconsin-Madison's Physical Sciences Laboratory during the late 1970s. Reynolds and colleagues, including Matt Haffner, a senior scientist in UW-M's astronomy department, later developed WHAM.
 
WHAM formally began life at Kitt Peak National Observatory (KPNO) in November 1996, using the flat mirrors of a two axis, all-sky siderostat passing light horizontally through a 0.6 m diameter, 8.6 m focal length objective lens into a 2.5 m x 2.5 m x 6 m trailer that contained the spectrometer, that used a low noise, high efficiency CCD camera as a multichannel detector behind a pair of  diameter Fabry-Perot etalons/spectrometers. The system was automated, so that the entire WHAM facility, including opening and closing at the beginning and end of the observing night, was operated from a campus office at the University of Wisconsin in Madison. It operated there from 1996 to 2008.
 
In 2009, WHAM was moved from KPNO to CTIO.
 
WHAM's field of view allows a whole sky survey in about 2 years. WHAM mapped the details of the Reynolds Layer.

See also
 List of astronomical observatories

References

External links
 Official website
 WHAM publications
 The Wisconsin H-Alpha Mapper Northern Sky Survey (2003 report)
 Early Results from the Wisconsin H-Alpha Mapper Southern Sky Survey (2010 report)
 People
 Matt Haffner - Senior Scientist
 Ron Reynolds - Emeritus 

University of Wisconsin–Madison
Optical telescopes
Astronomical observatories in Chile